Fresh Filter: Volume 1 is a compilation album of OPM songs by various local indie music acts that heard on Jam 88.3's supplemental program Fresh Filter. The compilation album is a joint project of Jam 88.3 and local vinyl retailer Satchmi, and is produced by the show's host Russ Davis.

It is composed of 12 tracks (in a 2-disc vinyl set) which are performed by local and unsigned Filipino indie music artists/bands (A Problem Like Maria, Autotelic, B.P. Valenzuela, Bullet Dumas, Cheats, Flying Ipis, Library Kids, Moonwlk, Ourselves the Elves, Tandems' 91, The Ransom Collective, and Yolanda Moon).

Track listing

References

2015 compilation albums
2015 debut albums